The Defenders were a Catholic agrarian secret society in 18th-century Ireland, founded in County Armagh. Initially, they were formed as local defensive organisations opposed to the Protestant Peep o' Day Boys; however, by 1790 they had become a secret oath-bound fraternal society made up of lodges. By 1796, the Defenders had allied with the United Irishmen, and participated in the 1798 rebellion. By the 19th century, the organisation had developed into the Ribbonmen.

Into the 21st century, some commentators on ad-hoc nationalist political violence in Ireland will still refer to it generically as Defenderism.

Origin and activities
The Defenders were formed in the mid-1780s by Catholics in response to the failure of the authorities to take action against the Protestant Peep o' Day Boys who launched nighttime raids on Catholic homes under the pretence of confiscating arms which Catholics were prohibited from possessing under the terms of the Penal Laws.

Having seen the fighting between the Nappach Fleet, Bunker's Hill Defenders, and the Bawn Fleet, between 1784 and 1785 go largely unpunished, they were encouraged to form their own grouping. At Grangemore, near Ballymacnab, County Armagh, an area that had previously suffered from a Peep o' Day Boys raid, such a grouping was founded and became known as the Defenders. Supplied with arms purchased from a Protestant shopkeeper in Armagh, they embarked on night-watches and patrols keeping an eye out for Peep o' Day Boys.

The Defenders started out as independent local groups, defensive in nature, however by 1790 they had merged into a widespread secret oath-bound fraternal organisation consisting of lodges, associated to a head-lodge led by a Grand Master and committee. The Defenders were greatly influenced by Freemasonry, and were made up of the lower class of Catholics. Each member had to swear an oath, which despite the penal laws which they were subject to, included the swearing of obedience to King George the Third, his successors, and the government. The oath itself was revised several times but kept its central character whilst focusing more on loyalty and solidarity.

By 1786 the Peep o' Day Boys and Defenders were opposed to each other and involved in confrontations.

Escalation of conflict
Conflict between the two groups spread from nighttime to daytime with fights at fairs, markets, and races etc. Throughout the rest of the 1780s fierce fighting predominated parts of County Armagh. Magistrates who were largely anti-Catholic and Protestant juries acquitted Peep o' Day Boys who were brought to trial whilst convicting and punishing Defenders. The government eventually sent the military in to try to end the trouble. Whilst successful in quelling daytime fighting, they failed to have an effect on nighttime disturbances. More troops were dispatched into the most troublesome areas.

In 1788, Lord Charlemont's re-organised Volunteer companies in County Armagh became involved in the conflict as Peep o' Day Boys joined their ranks. Despite being recreated to impartially end the trouble without the need of government troops, the new Volunteers only made things worse as they engaged in sectarian activities. Several clashes occurred between the Defenders and the Peep o' Day Boys at times backed up by the Volunteers. By 1789 the disturbances took on a different character focusing on religion itself, with both sides perpetrating atrocities, trying to outdo the other in their barbarism.

Militia Act 1793
Catholic Emancipation from 1778 onward had removed some of the penal restrictions imposed upon Catholics, who were now allowed to vote and join grand juries. However, the declaration of war by revolutionary France against Great Britain in February 1793 was also followed by the passing of the Militia Act which was a form of partial conscription. Wealthier Catholics such as the young Daniel O'Connell joined the Militia as it was proof of their gradual acceptance into the establishment, but it was harder for poorer rural Catholics whose help was needed on a family farm. Although the terms of the Act stipulated that conscripts would serve in Ireland, it was widely believed that men would be sent abroad and the resultant opposition saw thousands taking the Defender oath. Members were usually sworn in catechisms, one such oath went: "The French Defenders will uphold the cause. The Irish Defenders will pull down British laws."

The Defenders did not have a centralised leadership but were organised in loosely connected local cells and were limited by their lack of firearms. They sought to obtain them by launching raids on the big and small houses of the Ascendancy. In January 1793 the 'Annual Register' reported that forty farms had been raided for weapons near Dundalk, County Louth. However County Leitrim saw the most Defender activity with raids on Carrick-on-Shannon and Manorhamilton before eventual defeat at Drumkeerin in May 1793. Despite the ensuing wave of repression, the Leitrim Defenders again rose in open rebellion in 1795 and hundreds of soldiers had to be poured into the county to defeat them.

Battle of the Diamond

In September 1795 the Peep o' Day Boys, backed up by some Volunteer companies, and Defenders would clash in the short Battle of the Diamond, near Loughgall in County Armagh. The result was around 30 Defenders being killed. The aftermath of the battle saw the Peep o' Day Boys retire to James Sloan's inn in Loughgall, where they would found the Orange Order.

Society of United Irishmen
The Society of United Irishmen had early identified the Defenders as potential allies and leading members such as James Hope had regularly travelled throughout the country organising cells and distributing propaganda such as the Northern Star newspaper. Defender cells were easily transformed into United Irish cells and those who held dual membership were often referred to as being "up and up". The precise role of the Defenders as an organisation during the rebellion is therefore hard to assess but Colonel Foote, commander of the British force and one of its few survivors of the Battle of Oulart Hill referred to the victorious rebels as "Defenders" as opposed to United Irishmen in his official account of the defeat.

The Defenders of County Down withdrew support before the United Irish defeat at the Battle of Ballynahinch on 12 June 1798, as their leader John Magennis had received good local information on the size and placing of the British forces. Magennis had also suggested a night attack which Munro would not allow. The Defenders were also absent as a group from the earlier Battle of Antrim.

The Defenders were usually depicted as subject to residual sectarianism, ultra-Catholic, guilty of anti-Protestantism and having only paid at best lip service to the non-sectarian ideals of the United Irishmen. While this was undoubtedly true of a proportion of Defenders, Catholic priests were not immune to their wrath as in Athlone in 1793 where a priest who preached in favour of the Militia Act was almost hanged to death.

See also
Agrarian society
Croppy
Hearts of Oak (Ireland)
Hearts of Steel
Irish Volunteers (18th century)
Molly Maguires
Orange Order
Peep o' Day Boys
Ribbonism
Secret society
United Irishmen
Whiteboys
Captain Rock

References

Sources
Thomas Bartlett, Kevin Dawson, Daire Keogh, "Rebellion", Dublin 1998
 Liam Kelly "A Flame now Quenched: Rebels and Frenchmen in Leitrim 1793–98", Dublin 1998
 David Miller "Peep O' Day Boys and Defenders", Belfast 1990

Anti-Protestantism
Irish agrarian protest societies
Irish Rebellion of 1798
Irish secret societies
History of County Armagh
History of County Down
History of County Louth